Ptolemais was an ancient port city on the Canaanite coast in the region of Palestine, in the location of the present-day city of Acre, Israel. It was also called Ptolemais in Canaan (or Akko, Ake, or Akre in Canaanite Language). It was an Ancient bishopric, which became a double Catholic titular see.

In the Middle Ages, it was known as Acre amongst some Western European crusaders, who started a new, militantly Latin chapter there.

History 
Greek historians refer to the city as Ake, meaning "cure." According to the Greek myth, Heracles found curative herbs here to heal his wounds. Josephus calls it Akre. The name was changed to Antiochia Ptolemais shortly after Alexander the Great's conquest, and then to Ptolemais, probably by Ptolemy I Soter, after the Wars of the Diadochi lead to the partition of the kingdom of Alexander the Great and its inclusion first into the Egypt-based Lagid empire, then in the Seleucid Empire. 

Around 37 BC, the Romans conquered the Hellenized Phoenician port-city called Akko. It became a colony in southern Roman Phoenicia, called Colonia Claudia Felix Ptolemais Garmanica Stabilis. Ptolemais stayed Roman for nearly seven centuries until 636 AD, when was conquered by the Muslim Arabs. Under Augustus, a gymnasium was built in the city. In 4 BC, the Roman proconsul Publius Quinctilius Varus assembled his army there in order to suppress the revolts that broke out in the region following the death of Herod the Great.

During the rule of the emperor Claudius there was a building drive in Ptolemais and veterans of the legions settled here. The city was one of four colonies (with Berytus, Aelia Capitolina and Caesarea Maritima) created in ancient Levant by Roman emperors for veterans of their Roman legions. As a result, Claudius granted the title "Colonia Claudia Felix Ptolemais Garmanica Stabilis".  The city was a center of Romanization in the region, but most of the population was made of local Phoenicians and Jews: as a consequence after the Hadrian times the descendants of the initial Roman colonists were no more speaking Latin and were fully assimilated in less than two centuries (however the local society's customs were Roman).

In 66 AD Gessius Florus, the Roman Procurator of Judea, conducted an initial massacre of the Jews living in the city. The next year Vespasian, the Roman military commander (soon to be emperor), accompanied by his son Titus, moved from Akko-Ptolemais to suppress the Jewish rebellion in Galilee.

In 130 AD the port of Ptolemais was used as a base for the Roman Legions setting forth to suppress the Bar-Kochba revolt. After the destruction of Jerusalem many Jews settled in Ptolemais, that was losing its original Phoenician characteristics since Augustus times.

In 190 AD Christianity started to be important in the city: Clarus, the Bishop of Ptolemais, participated in a council of Christian leaders. Ptolemais grew to be an important port in the eastern Mediterranean sea of the Roman empire. After Hadrian times Ptolemais was the commercial center & port of Jewish Galilee and was starting to be no more part of Phoenicia.

In 351 AD Constantius Gallus suppressed a Jewish rebellion and did a small massacre of the Jews of Akko-Ptolemais (who were starting to be the majority of the city's population and rejected Roman domination).

Under Byzantine control the city lost importance and around 636 AD was conquered by the Arab Amr ibn al-Aas. Following the defeat of the Byzantine army of Heraclius by the Muslim army of Khalid ibn al-Walid in the Battle of Yarmouk, and the capitulation of the Christian city of Jerusalem to the Caliph Umar, Ptolemais was ruled  by the Rashidun Caliphate beginning in 638 AD.

Christianity center 
Ptolemais was an important center of early Christianity in the region. Saint Paul visited the city at the end of his third missionary journey.

Towards the end of the third century, Ptolemais was a predominantly Christian city, but with a large Jewish community. An unidentified visitor from Italy reported that in the sixth century the city had beautiful churches. Indeed, an important discovery was made in 2011: a Byzantine church in the middle of Crusaders' "San Giovanni d'Acri" (as was called Ptolemais in the Middle Ages).

Ecclesiastical History

Bishops of Ptolemais in Syria 
The Apostle Paul, returning from his trip to Macedonia and Achea, landed at Tyre, and from there sailed to Ptolemais, where he stayed some days with the local Christian community (Acts 21.7).

Ptolemais became of suffragan of the Metropolitan Archbishopric of Tyre.

The first bishop known is Clarus, who in 190 AD attended a Council meeting which saw some bishops of Phoenicia and Palestine to deal with the issue of the date of the Easter feast. But we must go back to the fourth century to find the next Bishop, Enea, who took part at the first Council of Nicaea in 325 AD and at the Synod held in Antioch in 341 AD. Nectabus was one of the fathers of the first Ecumenical Council of Constantinople in 381 AD. Between the 4th and 5th centuries lived Bishop Antiochus, opponent of John Chrysostom. Helladius participated in the first Council of Ephesus in 431 AD. Paul took part in the Council held at Antioch of 445 AD to judge the work of Athanasius of Perrhe and at the Council of Chalcedon of 451 AD. In 518 AD Bishop John signed a Synodal letter against Severus of Antioch and the Monophysite party. Finally, the last known Bishop of Ptolemais is George, who attended the second Council of Constantinople in 553 AD.

It faded after Islam was established in Greater Syria in the 7th century by the first Caliphs, conquering the Sassanid satrapy.

Crusaders
In the 12th century, the Crusaders started all over in their Kingdom of Jerusalem. From 1107 - 1190 AD including a Latin Catholic Diocese of Acre. Then reconquered in the 13th century for another further decades of Christian domination with Jewish communities peacefully living together.

Titular sees 
Long after the Crusader states had perished, the Catholic church nominally restored the see (linked to the Acre succession) as a titular see, actually twice, in different rite-specific branches.

Latin titular see 
 Established by nominal restoration as Episcopal Titular bishopric of Ptolemais (Latin) / Tolemaide (Curiate Italian)
 Gained 'territory' (i.e. apostolic succession) in 1870? from the suppressed Episcopal Titular bishopric of Acre (Akka), but suppressed circa 1895
 Restored and promoted in 1909 as Titular archbishopric of Ptolemais (Latin) / Tolemaide (Italian)
 Demoted back in 1925 as Episcopal Titular bishopric of Ptolemais (Latin) / Tolemaide (Italian; in 1926 renamed as Tolemaide di Fenicia)
 Renamed in 1933 as Titular bishopric of Ptolemais in Phœnicia (Latin) / Tolemaide di Fenicia (Italian) / Ptolemaiden(sis) in Phœnicia (Latin adjective)

It is vacant since  decades, having had the following incumbents, so far of the (mostly fitting) Episcopal, i.e. lowest) rank (with an archiepiscopal exception) :
 Carolus Ludovicus Hugo, Norbertines (O. Praem.) (1728.12.15 – death 1739.08.02) without actual prelature
 Armand de Rohan-Soubise-Ventadour (1742.07.30 – 1747.04.10) as Coadjutor Bishop of Strasbourg (France) (1742.05.21 – 1749.07.19); later created Cardinal-Priest with no Title assigned (1747.04.10 – death 1756.06.28), succeeded as Bishop of Strasbourg (1749.07.19 – 1756.06.28)
 Ludwik Ignacy Riaucour (1749.03.03 – death 1777.11) (Polish) as Auxiliary Bishop of Diocese of Luck (Ukraine) (1749.03.03 – 1777.11)
 Onufry Kajetan Szembek (1796.06.27 – 1797.09.05) as Coadjutor Bishop of Płock (Poland) (1796.06.27 – 1797.09.05); next succeeded as Bishop of Płock (1797.09.05 – death 1808.12.31)
 Luiz de Castro Pereira, Congregation of Saint Joseph (C.S.I.) (Portuguese) (1804.10.29 – 1822.08.01) as Bishop-Prelate of Territorial Prelature of Cuiaba (Brazil) (1804.10.29 – 1822.08.01); later Bishop of Bragança e Miranda (Portugal) (1821.04.21 – death 1822.08.01)
 Maciej Pawel Mozdzeniewski (polish) (1815.07.10 – death 1819.04.02) as Auxiliary Bishop of Archdiocese of Mohilev (Belarus) (1815.07.10 – 1819.04.02)
 Ferdinand Maria von Chotek (Austrian) (1817.04.14 – 1831.09.30) as Auxiliary Bishop of Archdiocese of Olomouc (Olmütz, Moravia) (1817.04.14 – 1831.09.30); later Bishop of Tarnów (Poland) (1831.09.30 – 1832.02.24), Metropolitan Archbishop of above Olomouc (1832.02.24 – death 1836.09.05)
 Franciscus Renatus Boussen (1832.12.17 – 1834.06.23), first as Coadjutor Bishop Ghent (Flanders, Belgium) (1832.12.17 – 1834.06.23), then as Apostolic Administrator of West Flanders (Flanders, Belgium) (1833.01.21 – 1834.05.27); later Bishop of Bruges (Bruges, Flanders, Belgium) (1834.05.27 – death 1848.01.01)
 Alois Josef Schrenk (1838.02.12 – 1838.09.17) as Auxiliary Bishop of Archdiocese of Olomouc (Olmütz, Moravia) (1838.02.12 – 1838.09.17); later Metropolitan Archbishop of Praha (Prague, Bohemia) ([1838.06.20] 1838.09.17 – death 1849.03.05)
 Tommaso Feeny (Thomas Feeny) (1839.07.27 – 1848.01.11) without actual prelature; next Bishop of Killala (Ireland) (1848.01.11 – 1873.08.09)
 Giovanni Antonio Balma, Oblates of the Virgin Mary (O.M.V.) (1848.09.05 – 1871.10.27) as Apostolic Vicar of Ava and Pegu (then British Burma=Myanmar) (1848.09.05 – 1855.09.09); later Metropolitan Archbishop of Cagliari (Sardinia, Italy) (1871.10.27 – death 1881.04.05)
 
BIOs TO BE ELABORATED
  Edmundo Luís Kunz (1955.08.01 – 1988.09.12)
 Louis-Eugène-Arsène Turquetil, O.M.I. (1931.12.15 – 1955.06.14)
 Titular Archbishop: Augustin Dontenwill, Missionary Oblates of Mary Immaculate (O.M.I.) (1909.01.19 – 1931.11.30)
 Cassien-Léonard de Peretti (1875.03.31 – 1892.02.22)
 Carmelo Pascucci (1871.10.27 – 1874.04.22)

Maronite titular see 
(Eastern Catholic, Antiochian Rite)
 Established as Episcopal Titular bishopric of Giovanni S. d’Acri (Latin 'Saint John of Acre') / Tolemaide di Siria (Curiate Italian), suppressed in 1890 but restored under those 'Crusader' names in 1919;
 Renamed in 1925 as Titular bishopric of Ptolemais (Latin) / Tolemaide (Curiate Italian; in 1926: renamed  Tolemaide di Fenicia), suppressed in 1933
 Restored in 1956 as Episcopal Titular bishopric of Ptolemais in Phœnicia (Latin) / Tolemaide di Fenicia (Curiate Italian) / Ptolemaiden(sis) in Phœnicia Maronitarum (Latin adjective).

It has had the following incumbents, of the fitting Episcopal (lowest) rank with an archiepiscopal exception:
Titular Bishops of Giovanni S. d’Acri of the Maronites
 Clement Bahouth [Clémént Bahous] (? – 1856.04.01) (? – 1856.04.01), without actual prelature; later Patriarch of Antioch of the Greek-Melkites (Syria) ([1856.04.01] 1856.06.16 – retired 1864.08.13), also (ex officio) titular Patriarch of Alexandria of the Greek-Melkites and titular Patriarch of Jerusalem of the Greek-Melkites ([1856.04.01] 1856.06.16 – 1864.08.13); died 1882
 Grégoire Youssef-Sayour (1856.11.13 – 1864.09.29), without actual prelature; later Patriarch of Antioch of the (Greek-)Melkites (Syria) ([1864.09.29] 1865.03.27 – 1897.07.13) and as above titular Patriarch of Alexandria of the (Greek-)Melkites and of Jerusalem of the (Greek-)Melkites ([1864.09.29] 1865.03.27 – 1897.07.13)
 Titular Archbishop of Giovanni S. d’Acri of the Maronites: Youssef Massad (1883 – death 1890), not prelature
 Luigi Giuseppe El-Khazen (1919.02.23 – 1925 see below), no prelature
 
Titular Bishop of Ptolemais of the Maronites
 Luigi Giuseppe El-Khazen (see above 1925 – 1933.02.22 see blow), no prelature
 
Titular Bishops of Ptolemais in Phœnicia  of the Maronites
 Joseph Khoury (1956.04.21 – 1959.12.11), then without prelature; later Eparch (Bishop) of Tyre of the Maronites (Lebanon) (1959.12.11 – 1965), promoted Archeparch (Archbishop) of Tyre of the Maronites (Lebanon) (1965 – 1992.02.05)
 Camille Zaidan (2011.08.13 – 2012.06.16) as Bishop of Curia of the (patriarchate of the) Maronites (2011.08.13 – 2012.06.16), later Archeparch (Archbishop) of Antelias of the Maronites (Lebanon) (2012.06.16 – ...)
 Joseph Mouawad  (2012.06.16 – 2015.03.14) as Bishop of Curia of the Maronites (2012.06.16 – 2015.03.14), later Bishop of Zahlé of the Maronites (Lebanon) (2015.03.14 – ...)
 Paul Abdel Sater (2015.07.28 – ...), Bishop of Curia of the Maronites, no previous prelature.

See also 
 List of Catholic dioceses in Holy land and Cyprus
 Berytus
 Caesarea Maritima
 Latin Catholic Diocese of Acre

Notes

Sources and external links 
 GCatholic - Latin titular see
 GCatholic - Maronite titular see

Bibliography 
 Butcher, Kevin. Roman Syria and the Near East Getty Publications. Los Angeles, 2003 
 Moše Šārôn. Corpus Inscriptionum Arabicarum Palaestinae (CIAP). Volumes 30-31 of Handbook of Oriental Studies. Section 1, The Near and Middle East, v.30 (Handbuch der Orientalistik). Publisher BRILL, 1997 

Coloniae (Roman)
1st-century BC establishments in the Roman Republic
Acre, Israel
Phoenician cities